Corethropsis is a genus of fungi of uncertain affinity within the division Ascomycota.

References

External links 

 
 Corethropsis at Index Fungarum
 

Ascomycota genera
Ascomycota enigmatic taxa
Taxa named by August Carl Joseph Corda
Taxa described in 1839